The Six-red World Championship is a six-red snooker tournament, played with the six  and six . Ding Junhui is the reigning champion.

History 
The event was first held in the 2008/2009 season, and was known as the Six-red Snooker International. The event was organised by the Asian Confederation of Billiards Sports. Forty-eight players were divided in 8 round-robin groups. The top four from each group moved into the knock-out stage. In 2009 the event was renamed the Six-red World Grand Prix. In 2010, it replaced a rival tournament (sponsored by 888sport) as the official six red snooker world championship, after the other event—held once in 2009—was discontinued. The event was not held in the 2011/2012 season, but it returned for the 2012/2013 season with the backing of the World Professional Billiards and Snooker Association. The event was held at the Montien Riverside Hotel in Bangkok, Thailand between 2008 and 2014. The following year it took place in the Fashion Island Shopping Mall, before the Convention Centre became the venue for the tournament from 2016 on.

The COVID-19 pandemic in 2020 prevented the event from being scheduled as it was not possible for tour players to travel to Thailand. In the 2022-23 snooker season, the event was listed as returning to the tour for the first time since 2019, where Stephen Maguire would have had an opportunity to defend his title. However, in the weeks leading up to the tournaments' official start date of 5 September 2022, the professional membership were notified that the tournament was to be cancelled. This decision led to criticism of the World Snooker Tour, as despite the well-understood position of the tournament being cancelled by both players and broadcasters, no announcement had been made to the public.

Winners

Stats

Finalists

References

 
Recurring sporting events established in 2008
World championships in snooker
Cue sports competitions in Thailand
Six-red snooker competitions
Sport in Bangkok
International sports competitions hosted by Thailand
2008 establishments in Thailand
Annual sporting events